Karl-Gustaf Svensson (3 October 1879 – 9 February 1962) was a Swedish sports shooter. He competed in the running deer, double shot event at the 1924 Summer Olympics.

References

External links
 

1879 births
1962 deaths
Swedish male sport shooters
Olympic shooters of Sweden
Shooters at the 1924 Summer Olympics
Sport shooters from Stockholm